Kevin Omar Mohammed is a Canadian citizen who was convicted for trying to join ISIS.

According to counter-terrorism expert Mubin Sheikh, who had been in touch with Mohammed on social media dating back to 2014,  Mohammed's background was West Indian-Canadian, not South Asian-Canadian, and he had considered joining both an al Qaeda affiliated group and the more radical ISIS.

In 2014, Mohammed traveled to Turkey and was smuggled across the border into Syria by members of Jabhat al-Nusra.  There is no evidence that Mohammed committed any offenses while in Syria for which he could face charges. Family members, concerned for his welfare, followed him and convinced him to return to Canada.

Terrorist threat 

After his return to Canada, Mohammed's social media activity triggered scrutiny.

In 2015, analysts noticed that he stopped making tweets that supported the activities of ISIS in favour of the less radical al Qaeda affiliated Jabhat al-Nusra; however, an online request he made two days after radical jihadists attacked an airport in Brussels triggered his arrest. Mohammed requested a customized scenario of the video game Call of Duty set in the Brussels airport that had just been attacked, which would allow him to play the role of one of the attackers. Attached to the tweet in which he made this request, Mohammed placed an image, from the perspective of a shooter, of unarmed civilian airport patrons being slaughtered.

Commenting on the image attached to that tweet, counter-terrorism expert Mubin Sheikh told the CBC:

Trial and parole hearings 
Mohammed initially faced a weapons charge when a search of his home found a large knife.  That charge was dropped and he was later tried for "participating in or contributing to, directly or indirectly, any activity of a terrorist group for the purpose of enhancing the ability of any terrorist group to facilitate or carry out a terrorist activity." He pled guilty in June 2017, and was convicted on October 31, 2017. The maximum sentence he could have received was ten years, but Mohammed received a sentence of four and half years after agreeing to plead guilty. Taking into account the time he was in custody, prior to his conviction, he will serve just two years.  His sentence includes a requirement that he participate in a de-radicalization program while in custody, that he be monitored for a further three years after his release, and that he not access the internet for three years. However, when the parole board considered his case in February 2019, it noted he had not participated in a de-radicalization program.

Details of Mohammed's activities and of security officials investigation into him weren't made public until he was sentenced on October 31, 2017.

In May 2018, Toronto Sun columnist Anthony Furey claimed that there are approximately 60 individuals who had returned to Canada from  Daesh, but described Mohammed as the only notable conviction.  In July 2018, Rebecca Louis, writing in the Western Journal of Legal Studies, recognized other notable convictions of individuals returning from Daesh.

References

Canadian Muslims
1993 births
Living people
21st-century Canadian criminals